Moravian Church is a historic church building on Swedesboro-Sharptown Road in Woolwich Township, Gloucester County, New Jersey.

It was built in 1786 and added to the National Register of Historic Places in 1973.

The property is currently under the stewardship of the Gloucester County Historical Society.

See also
National Register of Historic Places listings in Gloucester County, New Jersey
Gloucester County Historical Society, Woodbury, New Jersey

References

Churches on the National Register of Historic Places in New Jersey
Churches completed in 1786
Churches in Gloucester County, New Jersey
Moravian churches in the United States
National Register of Historic Places in Gloucester County, New Jersey
New Jersey Register of Historic Places
18th-century churches in the United States
Woolwich Township, New Jersey